Francisco Carlos Martins Vidal (born 4 September 1962), known as Chicão, is a Brazilian former footballer who played as a forward. He competed in the 1984 Summer Olympics with the Brazil national under-23 football team.

References

1962 births
Living people
Sportspeople from Mato Grosso do Sul
Association football forwards
Brazilian footballers
Olympic footballers of Brazil
Footballers at the 1984 Summer Olympics
Olympic silver medalists for Brazil
Olympic medalists in football
Sport Club Corinthians Paulista players
Clube Atlético Sorocaba players
Medalists at the 1984 Summer Olympics